Yunus Mallı (born 24 February 1992) is a professional footballer who plays as an attacking midfielder for Süper Lig club Kasımpaşa and the Turkey national team. Born in Germany, Mallı represents Turkey at international level.

Club career
On 5 January 2017, Malli joined VfL Wolfsburg signing a -year deal.

In July 2022, Mallı signed with Kasımpaşa.

International career
Mallı has 30 caps for Germany youth teams, including 11 for Germany U21. He made his debut on 11 November 2013, playing the second half in a win against Montenegro U21. On 6 November 2015, Mallı was selected for the Turkey national team to play friendlies against Qatar and Greece respectively. He was part of Euro 2016 squad of the Turkish national football team.

Career statistics

International

Scores and results list Turkey's goal tally first, score column indicates score after each Mallı goal.

Honors
Trabzonspor
 Süper Lig: 2021–22

Germany U17
UEFA European Under-17 Championship: 2009

References

External links

 
 
 
 
 

1992 births
Living people
German people of Turkish descent
Sportspeople from Kassel
Citizens of Turkey through descent
Turkish footballers
Footballers from Hesse
German footballers
Association football midfielders
Turkey international footballers
Germany under-21 international footballers
Germany youth international footballers
UEFA Euro 2016 players
Bundesliga players
Regionalliga players
Süper Lig players
Borussia Mönchengladbach players
Borussia Mönchengladbach II players
1. FSV Mainz 05 players
VfL Wolfsburg players
KSV Hessen Kassel players
1. FC Union Berlin players
Trabzonspor footballers
Kasımpaşa S.K. footballers